Where? is the debut album by bassist Ron Carter recorded in 1961 at Van Gelder Studio and released on the New Jazz label. Some reissues of the album appear under Eric Dolphy's name.

Reception
The AllMusic review by Jim Todd stated "Carter and Dolphy had played together in Chico Hamilton's group and on Dolphy's important 1960 date Out There. Where? has elements in common with both, but is closer to Hamilton's late-'50s chamber jazz than to the more outward-bound Dolphy date. ... Carter's skill is undeniable, but his playing on Where? is a bit polite and monochromatic. ...Dolphy -- playing bass clarinet, alto sax, and flute -- is a far more interesting prospect, even if he doesn't blow his face off to the extent he did in other settings"

Track listing
All compositions by Ron Carter except as indicated
 "Rally" — 5:42	
 "Bass Duet" — 5:43
 "Softly, as in a Morning Sunrise" (Oscar Hammerstein II, Sigmund Romberg)" — 7:37	
 "Where?" (Randy Weston)" — 5:58
 "Yes, Indeed" (Sy Oliver)" — 5:51	
 "Saucer Eyes" (Weston)" —5:08

Personnel
 Ron Carter  —  bass (tracks 2, 3, 6), cello (tracks 1, 4 & 5) 
 Eric Dolphy  —  alto saxophone (track 3), bass clarinet (track 1), flute (tracks 5 & 6)
 Mal Waldron  —  piano
 George Duvivier  —  bass (tracks 1, 2, 4 & 5)
 Charlie Persip  —  drums

References

New Jazz Records albums
Ron Carter albums
Eric Dolphy albums
1961 albums
Albums recorded at Van Gelder Studio
Albums produced by Esmond Edwards